The Krumen (also Kroumen, Kroomen) is an ethnic group living mostly along the coast of Liberia and Côte d’Ivoire.  Their numbers were estimated to be 48,300 in 1993, of which 28,300 were in Côte d’Ivoire.  They are a subgroup of the Grebo and speak the Krumen language.

They are also called Kru, and are related to (but distinct from) the Kru people of the Liberian interior.

Etymology
There has been much scholarly debate on the origin of the term, since there is little evidence of use of the term outside of the maritime environment in which the Krumen served as sailors, and the fact that many Grebo served in this capacity.  Hence the belief that its root was from "crewmen" in English (a pidgin form of which was a lingua franca among them, thanks to their service as on European vessels). One theory, advanced in the 1911 Encyclopædia Britannica was that it derived from Kraoh, which is the name of one subgroup in their home area.

History

Origins
The coast of eastern Liberia and western Ivory Coast were rarely visited by European vessels until the nineteenth century, and for that reason there are very few written texts that can illuminate its early history or the origin of the Krumen communities there.  There has also been very little archaeological work that might illuminate events or societies of the more distant past.  For that reason, oral tradition remains the most important key to the origin of the Krumen.

Traditions recorded in the mid nineteenth century by James Connelly relate that the Kru communities that lived along the shore of what is today southern Liberia and the reputed core settlement of the Krumen came down to the coast from the interior "some three generations back--say one hundred to one hundred fifty years..." from an original place he called Claho.  Coming down the Poor River they "learned the value of salt" and founded the town of Bassa, the subsequently moved again to Little Kroo, and then were subsequently joined by whole communities from the interior. These events likely occurred in the 1770s and are believed to be connected to more intensive European interest in trade in the region at about this time.  The original settlers from the interior eventually established five towns, Little Kroo, Setra Kroo, Kroo-Bar, Nana Kroo and King Will's Town, that came to be regarded as their home district, though soon other offshoots developed along the coast, and particularly in Freetown, Sierra Leone.

Seafaring
From the late eighteenth century onward, Krumen began working on European ships.  By the 1790s the inhabitants of their original region were being hired as free sailors on European ships engaged in the slave trade.  As the so-called "legitimate trade" replaced the slave trade in the nineteenth century and as trade along the West Africa coast increased, many Krumen signed on to the new vessels as seamen.  In the process there developed Krumen communities around all the major trading factories of the coast, from Sierra Leone around to the mouth of the Congo River.

A number of Kroomen (between 20 and 30) are buried in the Seaforth Old Burial Ground in Simon's Town, South Africa, where their graves can still be seen, and Kroomen is the name used to describe them on their gravestones. They were active in the Royal Navy from 1820 to as late as 1924, e.g.  landed a camp party with 12 Krumen in Elephant Bay in June of that year.  Many Kroomen joined the dockyard staff, others remained on board RN ships as seamen. They were given Western names by the men on the ships, leading to names that are amusing to the Western eye, Tom Ropeman and Will Cockroach amongst them. They were clearly commonly employed, and the names bestowed were not original, since the cemetery contains for example the remains of Tom Smith Number 1, to distinguish him from another Tom Smith.

Although the earliest Krumen mariners may have come from the five core towns, people from many other places and ethnicities joined the original Krumen, creating a mixed but strongly held identity, not only in their home district, but in the many trading posts and towns where they came to settle, and then people from those places also became effectively Krumen by taking on their identity and behavioral characteristics.  Some scholars maintain that in fact the term Krumen and indeed even Kru originated in the maritime branch of the culture alone, being transported back to the homelands from the dispersed communities, but others contend that the process of identity formation was more complex involving both maritime and shore communities.

Krumen sailors were organized as small companies under a headman.  They would paddle in small canoes as far as a dozen miles out to see to meet ships as they arrived and negotiated their employment on the spot.  Headmen often carried credentials from previous stints of employment in boxes or other containers, and negotiations were conducted rapidly. During the earlier part of the nineteenth century foreign observers often gave the Kru high praise for their honesty, courage, efficiency and willingness to do hard work.  Later observers, however, had more disparaging comments to make, though either way, few ships plied African waters without many Kru sailors on board.

Although initially Krumen were interested only in sailor's work, in time some took up land based employment doing all sorts of work in the many trading factories that grew up all along the African coast from Sierra Leone to the mouth of the Congo River.  They were also recruited as soldiers and common laborers, some traveling as far as India and the Malayan peninsula to the east.  Krumen workers served French employers in the French attempt to dig the Panama Canal, others were employed in Jamaica.

Culture
In the late nineteenth century reports described the Krumen are divided into small commonwealths, each with a hereditary chief whose duty is simply to represent the people in their dealings with strangers. The real government is vested in the elders, who wear as insignia iron rings on their legs. Their president, who holds religious authority as well, guards the national symbols, and his house is sanctuary for offenders until their guilt is proved. Personal property is held in common by each family. Land also is communal, but the rights of the actual cultivator cease when he fails to farm it.

Religion
The first descriptions of core group of Krumen's religion were done by missionaries notably James Connolley, But these accounts can also be augmented by more detailed accounts of the Grebo of nearby Cape Palmas who were linguistically and culturally related and were, by 1855 becoming Krumen themselves by going to sea and may have been as important in the overall culture as the core Krumen themselves.  The central elements of the spiritual universe of this region included a figure identified by missionaries as a high, creator God, named Nyesoa, spirits or deities associated with territories called, familial spiritual guardians called ku and finally kwi or the souls of the departed who remained near by and could influence events.

These spiritual entities were contacted through a class of people called deya, who underwent long and specialized training and apprenticeship to take up their office.  They addressed problems both medical and spiritual using pharmaceutical and spiritual remedies.

The Kru languages

Wilhelm Bleek classified the Kru language with the Mandingo family, and in this he was followed by R. G. Latham; S. W. Koelle, who published a Kru grammar (1854), disagreed. Now Kru is considered a primary branch of the Niger-Congo family.

Notes

References
Behrens, Christine (1974).  Le Croumen de la côte occidental de l'Afrique Talence: Ministère de la Education Nationale.
Brooks, George (1972).  The Kru Mariner in the Nineteenth Century: An Historical Compendium, Newark, DE: Liberian Studies Association of America.
Breitborde,L. B.  (1991). "City, Countryside and Kru Ethnicity," Africa: Journal of the International African Institute 61/2 (1991): 186-201.
McEvoy,Frederick (1977). "Understanding Ethnic Realities among the Grebo and Kru Peoples of Western Africa," Africa: Journal of the International African Institute 47/1: 62-80.

Further reading

Büttikofer, Johann (1890), Reisebilder aus Liberia 2 vols., Leiden.
Burroughs, Robert (2009) "[T]rue Sailors of Western Africa:  Kur Seafaring Identity in British Traveler's Accounts of the 1830s and 40s," Journal for Maritime Research 11: 51-67.
Harry H. Johnston (1906), Liberia London. 
Martin, Jane (1995).  "Krumen 'Down the Coast':  Liberian Migrants on the West African Coast in the 19th and early 20th centuries," International Journal of African Historical Studies 18: 401-23.
Nicholas (1872), in Bulletin de la Société Anthropologique
A. de Quatrefages and E. T. Hamy (1878–1879), Crania ethnica, 9: 363 (a biometric study)
Schlagintweit-Sakununski, "Angaben zur Charaturistik der Kru-Neger," Sitzungsberichte Bayerische Akademie der Wissenschaften zu München 5(1875): 183-202 (a biometric study of 3 Kru sailors on a ship bound for India in 1857).

Ethnic groups in Liberia
Ethnic groups in Ivory Coast